800 Heroes is a 1938 Chinese historical war drama film directed by Ying Yunwei and written by Yang Hansheng. The film stars Yuan Muzhi, Chen Bo'er, Hong Hong, and Zhang Shufan. The film is about the Defense of Sihang Warehouse in 1937 Shanghai. The film was released on April 2, 1938, in China.

Plot
On August 13, 1937, the Imperial Japanese Army invades Shanghai, Xie Jinyuan, the Lieutenant Colonel of the 524th Regiment of the 88th Division of the National Revolutionary Army, leads more than 400 young officers to guard the Sihang Warehouse.

Cast
 Yuan Muzhi as Lieutenant Colonel Xie Jinyuan
 Chen Bo'er as Yang Huimin, a girl scout guide deliver a flag to the soldiers
 Hong Hong as Yao Ruifang
 Zhang Shufan as Battalion Commander Yang

Release
800 Heroes was released on April 2, 1938, in China.

See also
 The Eight Hundred
  Eight Hundred Heroes

References

External links
 
 
 

1938 films
1930s Mandarin-language films
Second Sino-Japanese War films
Films set in 1937
Chinese historical drama films
1930s war drama films
Chinese war drama films
Siege films
Films set in Shanghai
1930s historical drama films
1938 drama films
Films directed by Ying Yunwei